This is a list of cricketers who represented their country at the 1983 Cricket World Cup in England which took place from 9 June 1983 to 25 June 1983. The oldest player at the 1983 Cricket World Cup was Somachandra De Silva (40/41) while the youngest player was  Rumesh Ratnayake (19), both of Sri Lanka. The youngest in a 1983 World Cup squad (who did not play in any match, however) was Graeme Hick (17) of Zimbabwe.

Australia
Manager:  Phil Ridings

Background
Australia had won the triangular one day series at home over New Zealand and England during the 1982-83 summer. Kim Hughes had been in poor form for most of the summer but come good for the finals. The squad was picked in May. Greg Chappell was originally picked in the squad. Tom Hogan was selected over Bruce Yardley. Trevor Chappell was the biggest surprise for the squad, though Steve Smith had been a regular in Australia's one day team in the summer and he was overlooked. Later in the month Greg Chappell pulled out due to injury and Macleay replaced him.

England

Background 
Alan Butcher, David Bairstow, Eddie Hemmings, Phil Edmonds, Bob Taylor, David Mark Smith, Bill Athey, Wilf Slack, David Thomas were among the probables for the World Cup.

India 
Manager:  PR Man Singh

Background
The Indian squad was announced in May 1983. The other probables considered were Gundappa Viswanath, Srinivasaraghavan Venkataraghavan, Maninder Singh, Ashok Malhotra, Surinder Amarnath, Anshuman Gaekwad, T. A. Sekhar. Sunil Valson was not in the original list of probables.
The selection committee was headed by Ghulam Ahmed and had Chandu Borde, Chandu Sarwate, Bishan Singh Bedi and Pankaj Roy as the other members.

New Zealand
Manager:  Allan Wright

Background
Trevor Franklin and Evan Gray travelled with the team, but were not considered for the World Cup.

Pakistan
Manager:  Intikhab Alam

Sri Lanka
Manager:  Tambyah Murugaser

West Indies

Background
Milton Pydanna was on standby as wicket-keeper in case of any injury to Jeff Dujon.

Zimbabwe

References

External links
 1983 Cricket World Cup – Cricinfo.com.

Cricket World Cup squads
1983 Cricket World Cup